Ibn Batouta Stadium (Berber: ⴰⵏⵏⴰⵔ ⵏ ⵉⴱⵏ ⴱⴰⵜⵓⵜⴰ) is a multi-use stadium in Tangier, Morocco. It is used mostly for football matches and big events such as ceremonies or concerts. The stadium has a capacity of 65,000 people. It serves as the new home of IR Tanger, replacing the former Stade de Marchan. The stadium is named after the Moroccan Berber Scholar and explorer Ibn Battuta.

History

It was inaugurated on April 26, 2011. On July 27, the stadium hosted the 2011 Trophée des champions, in which Marseille beat Lille 5–4.

It was one of the confirmed host stadiums for the 2015 Africa Cup of Nations, which was to be hosted by Morocco until it was stripped of its hosting rights.

The stadium hosted the 2017 Trophée des Champions for the second time on July 29, in which Paris Saint-Germain beat Monaco 2–1.

When Morocco hosted the 2018 African Nations Championship the stadium hosted six matches in the Group stage and one in the Quarter-finals.

It hosted the 2018 Supercopa de España match between the Copa del Rey runners-up, Sevilla, and the winners of the 2017–18 Copa del Rey and 2017–18 La Liga, Barcelona,  in which Barcelona beat Sevilla 2–1

It was one of the venues in Morocco's failed bid for the 2026 FIFA World Cup. It was slated to host the Quarter-Finals if Morocco had been awarded the World Cup.

It experienced a renovation to increase its capacity and change the exterior to host the 2022 FIFA Club World Cup. It was planned that the capacity will increase from 45,000 seats to 65,000. On 25 January 2023, it was confirmed that the stadium is ready to host the 2022 FIFA Club World Cup.

There are current studies to change the exterior of the stadium by making it fully covered, and removing the running tracks to increase its capacity to 80,000 before 2025 in conjunction with possibly hosting the 2025 Africa Cup of Nations, according to Abdelmalek Abron, a member of the FRMF and head of the Infrastructure Committee of the football system in Morocco.

International Events

2022 FIFA Club World Cup

See also
List of African stadiums by capacity
List of football stadiums in Morocco
List of association football stadiums by capacity

References

Football venues in Morocco
Sport in Tangier
Buildings and structures in Tangier
Tourist attractions in Tangier
Ittihad Tanger